Dr. Khaldoun A. Sweis is an American Professor of Philosophy specializing in the study of the human mind and ontology of metaphysics. A noted author and global speaker, Dr. Sweis pioneered a unique new method of transformational coaching. Drawing from an amalgamation of philosophy, psychology, theology, mythology, and cognitive-behavioral therapy—Dr. Sweis helps people find meaning, purpose and joy in their life.

The Phoenix Effect 
Based on his forthcoming book, The Phoenix Effect is widely considered to be the pinnacle of his life’s work. According to Sweis, “The Phoenix Effect will rapidly and permanently change the trajectory of a person’s life. Individuals emerge stronger, more capable and self-assured than ever before.”

Background and Education 

Dr. Sweis is recognized for his expertise and insights in both the philosophy of mind and philosophy of religion. He is the founder of the Socratic Project, which hosts debates and discussions on critical issues and addresses the existential questions of life. He tutored in philosophy at Oxford University in England. He is currently Associate Professor of Philosophy at Olive Harvey College in Chicago, Illinois where he formerly served as chair. A member of the American Philosophical Association, Sweis has been teaching Philosophy for over ten years, as well as speaking nationally as well as conferences in England, Romania, Australia, and Hong Kong. 

He is well-known for his book Debating Christian Theism, published by Oxford University Press and co-edited with philosophers J.P. Moreland and Chad V. Meister. Sweis has been featured in the organs of the Royal Institute of Philosophy, the Forum of Christian Leaders, and Christian Today. He received his PhD from the University of Hull in the United Kingdom. His dissertation was in the area of Philosophy of the mind and cognitive science.

Career 
Sweis taught Ethics, Philosophy of Religion and Philosophy of Mind at Oxford University in Oxford England. Sweis currently teaches at the City Colleges of Chicago. He created and is known for the Socratic Project where he has hosted debates about ethics, politics and public policy. He has debated Emerson Green over the existence of evil and God.

Sweis has done multiple interviews and lectures on theology, philosophy of mind, ethics and culture with the International Forum of Christian Leaders. Sweis launched the podcast “Logically Faithful: Examining the beliefs that drive us” where he  has interviewed guest including three-time Emmy-award- winning Ken Davis, American homicide detective Jim Warner Wallace, Eric Metaxas and radio host Gregory Koukl. He was interviewed by Dr. Dionne Wright Poulton who is an Educator, Diversity and Inclusion Consultant and Conflict Mediator. The University of Chicago paper interviews cover Sweis . The Think Institute hosted Sweis multiple times on issues of masculinity and life coaching.

Publications 
Killing God: Addressing the Seven Most Common Objections from the New Atheist
Debating Christian Theism (co-editor with J.P.Moreland and Chad Meister)
Christian Apologetics: An anthology of primary sources
Think : A Journal of the Royal Institute of Philosophy
Existing without my body: technological and spiritual possibilities
 Journal of the International Society of Christian Apologetics
 Morality: Absolute not relative
 The Paradoxes of Naturalism
 Consciousness: What a Conversation from leading thinkers would sound like
 Truth, Tolerance and Romance, originally in the Scribe 1998
Christian Today “how to reach your secular neighbor”
 Question of Icons in Eastern Orthodoxy : Where is the line drawn between worship and veneration?

References 

American philosophers
Christian apologists
Living people
American Christian theologians
Year of birth missing (living people)